Randle Jasper Smith (July 25, 1908 – January 8, 1962) was a United States district judge of the United States District Court for the Western District of Missouri.

Education and career

Born in Campbell, Missouri, Smith received an Artium Baccalaureus degree from the University of Missouri in 1931. He was in private practice in Springfield, Missouri from 1931 to 1956. He was a member of the Missouri Senate from 1943 to 1954.

Federal judicial service

On June 5, 1956, Smith was nominated by President Dwight D. Eisenhower to a seat on the United States District Court for the Western District of Missouri vacated by Judge Charles Evans Whittaker. Smith was confirmed by the United States Senate on July 2, 1956, and received his commission the next day. He served as Chief Judge from 1961 until his death on January 8, 1962.

References

Sources
 

1908 births
1962 deaths
University of Missouri alumni
Missouri state senators
Judges of the United States District Court for the Western District of Missouri
United States district court judges appointed by Dwight D. Eisenhower
20th-century American judges
People from Campbell, Missouri
20th-century American politicians